Lawless may refer to:

Arts and entertainment
 Lawless (British TV series), a 2004 TV miniseries starring Trevor Eve as John Paxton
 Lawless (film), a 2012 American film directed by John Hillcoat
 Lawless (American TV series), a 1997 TV series starring Brian Bosworth as John Lawless
 Lawless, a 1999 TV film starring Kevin Smith (New Zealand actor) as John Lawless
 The Lawless (novel), a 1978 novel by John Jakes
 The Lawless, a 1950 drama film
 Tracy Lawless, a main character in the comic book series Criminal

Other uses 
 Lawless (surname)
 Lawless Creek, a creek in British Columbia, Canada

See also
 Lawlessness